Dacy Airport is a privately owned public-use airport located 1 mile southwest Harvard, Illinois.

History 
Dacy Airport was founded just after World War 2 by B-24 Bomber chief John Dacy and his wife Elsie. The two have since been inducted into the Illinois Aviation Hall of Fame. The airport features flight training services along with aircraft maintenance facilities that can perform major repairs and overhauls.

Facilities and aircraft 
The airport has three turf runways. Runway 9/27 measures 3589 x 105 ft (1094 x 32 m); runway 14/32 measures 2633 x 100 ft (803 x 30 m); runway 18/36 measures 2577 x 120 ft (785 x 37 m).

The airport operates its own fixed-based operator (FBO), offering parking and hangars, fuel aircraft rental, a pilot's lounge, work stations, and flight instruction.

For the 12-month period ending August 31, 2019, the airport averages 55 aircraft operations per day, or roughly 20,000 per year. All are general aviation, split evenly between transient and local traffic. For that same time period, there are 34 aircraft based on the field: 32 single-engine and 2 multi-engine airplanes.

Accidents and incidents 

 On August 24, 2022, a Stearman B75 biplane crashed while landing at Dacy Airport. The plane drifted right and nosed over into a field after landing, and while it suffered substantial damage, the pilot was uninjured. The accident is under investigation.

References 

Airports in Illinois